Makoua is a town in the Republic of the Congo, lying at the southern edge of the rainforest, north of Owando.  It is home to an airport. It lies on the equator.

Climate
Makouas has a tropical rainforest climate (Af), with heavy rainfall year-round.

References

Cuvette Department
Populated places in the Republic of the Congo